Coleophora squamella is a moth of the family Coleophoridae. It is found from the Czech Republic to Sardinia and Italy and from France to Romania. It is also known from Turkey.

Adults are on wing in autumn and late spring.

The larvae feed on Dorycnium pentaphyllum, Dorycnium pentaphyllum germanicum, Lotus corniculatus, Lotus cytisoides, Lotus tenuis and Lotus uliginosus. They create a laterally compressed, somewhat arched composite leaf case of 5–6 mm, made of only a few, rather large leaf fragments. The mouth angle is about 45°. Larvae can be found from early summer to spring.

References

squamella
Moths of Europe
Moths of Asia
Moths described in 1885